Gagnier is a surname shared by several notable people:

 Ed Gagnier (1882–1946), French-American baseball player
 Ed Gagnier (born 1936), American gymnast and coach
 Holly Gagnier (born 1962), American actress
 Laurent Gagnier (born 1979), French footballer